Wingate by Wyndham (formerly known as Wingate Inn) is a brand of independently owned hotels that targets business travelers. Wingate opened its first hotel in July 1996. Since then, over 100 new Wingate by Wyndhams have been opened. It competes with chains like Hilton Garden Inn, Courtyard by Marriott, and Hyatt Place. Wingate by Wyndham is a part of Wyndham Hotels & Resorts, formerly part of Cendant. In late 2007, Wingate Inn officially changed its name to Wingate by Wyndham. As of December 31, 2018, it has 164 properties with 14,858 rooms.

The typical Wingate by Wyndham property offers free hot breakfast, free high-speed Internet access, upscale bedding, and workrooms. Most properties have a 24-hour snack bar or mini-mart, but unlike its previously mentioned competitors, it usually does not have full-service restaurants.

References

Wingate by Wyndham, Hotel Wingate Dieppe Official Site

Wyndham brands
Hotels established in 1996